Barn-owls (family Tytonidae) are one of the two families of owls, the other being the true owls or typical owls, Strigidae. They are medium to large owls with large heads and characteristic heart-shaped faces. They have long, strong legs with powerful talons. They also differ from the Strigidae in structural details relating in particular to the sternum and feet.

Barn-owls are a wide-ranging family, although they are absent from northern North America, Saharan Africa, and large parts of Asia. They live in a wide range of habitats from deserts to forests, and from temperate latitudes to the tropics. Within these habitats, they live near agricultural areas with high amounts of human activity. The majority of the 20 living species of barn-owls are poorly known. Some, like the red owl, have barely been seen or studied since their discovery, in contrast to the common barn-owl, which is one of the best-known owl species in the world. However, some subspecies of the common barn-owl possibly deserve to be separate species, but are very poorly known.

Five species of barn-owl are threatened, and some island species went extinct during the Holocene or earlier (e.g., Tyto pollens, known from the fossil record of Andros Island in the Bahamas, and possibly the basis for the mythical chickcharney). Barn-owls are mostly nocturnal and generally non-migratory, living in pairs or singly.

Taxonomy and systematics
Barn-owls consist of two extant subfamilies: the Tytoninae or Tyto owls (including the common barn owl) and the Phodilinae or bay owls. The modern genera Tyto and Phodilus are thought to have originated from a common ancestor from the Oligocene period. It is believed the modern genus Tyto descended from large nocturnal birds in the West Indies during the Quaternary. The systematics of this group began with the discovery of Tyto ostologa (now extinct), whose remains were found in north-central Haiti. This discovery led to the finding of Tyto pollens, Tyto noeli, and Tyto riveroi in nearby cave deposits, all of which are now extinct and were also considered giant. The Sibley-Ahlquist taxonomy unites the Caprimulgiformes with the owl order; here, barn-owls are a subfamily, Tytoninae. This is unsupported by more recent research (see Cypselomorphae), but the relationships of the owls in general are still unresolved.

Extant genera
Two extant genera are recognized:
 Genus Tyto – true barn-owls, grass owls and masked owls (17 species)
 Genus Phodilus – bay owls (2 species)

Genus Tyto 

Some of the Tyto species that exist include the common barn owl (Tyto alba), the American barn owl (Tyto furctata), the Australian barn owl (Tyto delicatula), and the Eastern Barn Owl (T. javanica). Within each of these species, there are many subspecies. Of the common barn owl there are 10 subspecies: T. alba affinis, T. alba alba, T. alba erlangeri, T. abla ernesti, T. alba gracilirostris, T. alba guttata, T. alba hypermetra, T. alba javanica, T. alba schmitzi, and T. alba stertens. Of the American barn owl, there are 5 subspecies: T. furcata attempta, T. furcata furcata, T. furcata hellmayri, T. furcata pratincola, and T. furcata tuidara. Of the Australian barn owl, there are 4 subspecies: T. delicatula delicatula, T. delicatula interposita, T. delicatula meeki, and T. delicatula sumbaensis.

The common barn owl (T. alba) can be found in Africa and parts of Asia, including Eurasia. The American barn owl (T. furcata) can be found from North to South America. Lastly, the Australian barn owl (T. delicatula) can be found in Australia, New Zealand, Polynesia, and Asia.

Genus Phodilus 
This genus includes the Oriental bay owls (P. badius) and the Sri Lanka bay owls (P. assimilis). Bay owls have a much smaller distribution than genus Tyto, with Oriental bay owls (P. badius) found in tropical Asia and Sri Lanka bay owls (P. assimilis) found in Sri Lanka and southwestern India.

Extinct genera
The fossil record of barn-owls goes back to the Eocene, with the family eventually losing ground to the true owls after the radiation of rodents and owls during the Neogene epoch. Two subfamilies are known only from the fossil record: the Necrobyinae and the Selenornithinae. At least four extinct genera of barn-owls have been described:
 Genus Nocturnavis (Late Eocene/Early Oligocene) – includes Bubo incertus
 Genus Necrobyas (Late Eocene/Early Oligocene – Late Miocene, France) – includes Bubo arvernensis and Paratyto
 Genus Selenornis (Late Eocene/Early Oligocene of Quercy, France) – includes Asio henrici
 Genus Prosybris (Late Eocene/Early Oligocene of Quercy(?) – Early Miocene of France and Austria)

Placement unresolved
 Tytonidae gen. et sp. indet. "TMT 164" (Middle Miocene of Grive-Saint-Alban, France) - Prosybris?
 Genus Palaeotyto (Late Eocene/Early Oligocene) from Quercy, France. Placement in this family is tentative, it may instead belong to the family Sophiornithidae.
 Genus Palaeobyas (Late Eocene/Early Oligocene) from Quercy, France. Placement in this family is tentative, it may instead belong to the family Sophiornithidae.

Former genera
The supposed "giant barn-owl" Basityto from the Early Eocene of Grafenmühle (Germany) was actually a crowned crane (Balearica); the presumed "Easter Island barn-owl", based on subfossil bones found on Rapa Nui, has turned out to be a procellarid; and the specimen originally described as the fossilized Pliocene Lechusa stirtoni was later determined to be recent remains of a modern-day American barn owl.

Description
The barn-owl's main characteristic is the heart-shaped facial disc, formed by stiff feathers which serve to amplify and locate the source of sounds when hunting. Further adaptations in the wing feathers eliminate sound caused by flying, aiding both the hearing of the owl listening for hidden prey and keeping the prey unaware of the owl. Barn-owls overall are darker on the back than the front, usually an orange-brown colour, the front being a paler version of the back or mottled, although considerable variation is seen even within species.

Bay owls closely resemble the Tyto owls, but have a divided facial disc, ear tufts, and tend to be smaller.

References

External links

Barn owls on the Internet Bird Collection

Owls

Extant Eocene first appearances
Taxa named by Robert Ridgway